Hanzhong 2327 School(name in Chinese: 陕西汉中2327职工子弟学校 ) is a combination elementary school, middle school, and high school in Puzhen, Hanzhong, Shaanxi province, China. It was built in 1974, and was engineered by the No. 2, No. 3 and No. 27 factories of Hanzhong N. 012 base, which is one part of the Ministry of Aeronautics industry. In 1982, a section of the Shaanxi geology and minerals bureau affiliated with the school in order to address their children's education.

Education in Shaanxi
Schools in China
High schools in Shaanxi
Educational institutions established in 1974